This is a list of current and former Roman Catholic churches in the Roman Catholic Archdiocese of Indianapolis. The archdiocese covers the city of Indianapolis and the southern half of Indiana. The cathedral church of the archdiocese is Saints Peter and Paul Cathedral in Indianapolis.

Indianapolis

Richmond

Terre Haute

Other areas

References

 
Indianapolis